Somewhere to Run is a 1989 British drama television film about teenage runaways. Directed by Carol Wiseman and written by Matthew Jacobs, it stars Robin Weaver and Vicky Murdock as two teenage girls who run away from home and find themselves on the streets of London. The film also stars Angela Pleasence and Michael Jayston. It was produced by Thames Television for the ITV network, and received its ITV debut on 11 July 1989.

Plot summary

Teenagers Sarah (Weaver) and Debbie (Murdock) run away from home, before meeting shortly after arriving in London. Debbie, the older and more streetwise of the two, is running from a generally bad home life, where her family is poor and her father drinks excessively. Sarah is running from a more affluent home, where she has been sexually abused by her father (Jayston). Both girls stay at a hostel for runaways. Debbie manages to get herself into college, while Sarah unsuccessfully tries to get her father prosecuted, but is instead returned home by the authorities. She runs away again and ends up on the streets selling herself. She attempts suicide by stepping out in front of a lorry but is injured and ends up in hospital. The film ends as she lies in hospital, while in the background a radio plays. Debbie calls a request show asking for a dedication for Sarah, with whom she has lost touch.

Cast

Robin Weaver as Sarah
Vicky Murdock as Debbie
Angela Pleasence as Anita Fitzpatrick
Michael Jayston as Roger Fitzpatrick
Josette Simon as Christine
Paul Brooke as Abrahams
Sara Kestelman as Magistrate
Michael Grandage as Tim
Kathryn Pogson as Liz
Natasha Pyne as Debbie's Mother
Ray Trickett as Gillette 
Richard Cordery as Lawyer
James Hayes as Client in Car
Natalie Abbott as Karen
Walter Sparrow as Neighbour

External links

1989 television films
1989 films
1989 drama films
1989 in British television
1980s British films
1980s English-language films
British drama television films
Films about prostitution in the United Kingdom
Films about runaways
Films scored by Carl Davis
Films set in London
ITV television dramas